is a member of the Japanese Communist Party serving in the House of Representatives. He thinks that foreign workers should be protected by worker protection rules.

References

Living people
Japanese communists
Japanese Communist Party politicians
Members of the House of Representatives (Japan)
1961 births